John Kincade is a sports talk show host based in Philadelphia, on 97.5 The Fanatic. Until recently he was heard nationally as a Sunday morning host of The JK Show on CBS Sports Radio. John formerly co-hosted the lunchtime Noon-3pm Buck and Kincade Show with former University of Georgia national championship quarterback, Buck Belue. The duo had been together since September 2000 (more than 3,000 shows and counting) making it the second longest running radio show in the Atlanta market behind only Rhubarb Jones. Kincade also previously worked as a sports talk show host on WQXI (AM) 790 The Zone in Atlanta and was a contributor to the popular WIP Morning Show in Philadelphia with Angelo Cataldi from 1992 to 1994.

John formerly hosted The John Kincade Show on ESPN Radio, but this contract ended and he moved to CBS Sports Radio. While working with ESPN Radio he served as a fill-in host on The Herd and other programs.

John also is the host for the Climate Change Denier Hour and is also the Rinkside Reporter for SportSouth for all Home games. Kincade served as radio anchor of Final Four coverage from Atlanta in 2007 for the network.

Kincade appeared on the ESPN Classic programs Classic Now and Missing Link and on ESPN News Hot List.

He received a Chairman's Citation from the National Leukemia and Lymphoma Society for his work with the charity in 2007. Kincade hosts the annual "Strike Out Leukemia and Lymphoma Radiothon" annually on  680 The Fan. The 2008 event raised over $112,000 dollars and in eight years the event has raised over $700,000.

Kincade was the subject of a feature in Cigar Aficionado magazine that recognized him as one of the top talents in American sports talk radio. Others awardees included Hank Goldberg of WQAM, Tom Tolbert of KNBR and Glenn Ordway of WEEI-FM. Since 2015, he has also been the co-host of The Big Podcast starring NBA legend and Basketball Hall of Famer Shaquille O'Neal.

A two-time cancer survivor, Kincade is a graduate of the School of Communications at Temple University and is originally from Broomall, Pennsylvania where he graduated from Cardinal O'Hara High School.

References

People from Marple Township, Pennsylvania
Temple University alumni
American sports radio personalities
Radio personalities from Atlanta
CBS Radio Sports
Living people
Year of birth missing (living people)